Bembidion guttula is a species of ground beetle native to Europe.

References

guttula
Beetles described in 1792
Beetles of Europe